Timea Bacsinszky was the defending champion, but chose not to participate this year.

Heather Watson won the title, defeating Kirsten Flipkens in the final, 3–6, 6–2, 6–3.

Seeds

Draw

Finals

Top half

Bottom half

Qualifying

Seeds

Qualifiers

Draw

First qualifier

Second qualifier

Third qualifier

Fourth qualifier

References
Main Draw
Qualifying Draw

Monterrey Open - Singles
2016 Singles